Complete results for Women's Slalom competition at the 2013 World Championships. It was the tenth race of the championships and 139 athletes from 53 countries competed.

Results
The first run was started at 10:00 local time (UTC+1) and the second run at 13:30.

References

Slalom, women's
2013 in Austrian women's sport
FIS